Bolitoglossa pesrubra is a species of salamander in the family Plethodontidae.
It is endemic to Cordillera de Talamanca, Costa Rica.

Its natural habitat is tropical moist montane forests.
It is threatened by habitat loss.

References

Bolitoglossa
Amphibians of Costa Rica
Endemic fauna of Costa Rica
Taxonomy articles created by Polbot
Amphibians described in 1952